The III Skarpnäcksloppet was a non-championship Formula One motor race held at Skarpnäck Airfield, Skarpnäck, Stockholm on 13 September 1953. The race was won by Erik Lundgren in a Ford Special.

Results

References

Skarpnäcksloppet
Skarpnäcksloppet
Skarpnäcksloppet